The Hong Kong Diploma of Secondary Education Examination (HKDSE) is an examination organised by the Hong Kong Examinations and Assessment Authority (HKEAA). The HKDSE examination is Hong Kong's university entrance examination, administered at the completion of a three-year senior secondary education, allowing students to gain admissions to undergraduate courses at local universities through JUPAS. Since the implementation of the New Senior Secondary academic structure in 2012, HKDSE replaced the Hong Kong Certificate of Education Examination (O Level, equivalent of GCSE) and Hong Kong Advanced Level Examination (A Level).

Under the NSS (New Senior Secondary) academic structure, pupils are required to study four compulsory "core subjects" (Chinese and English languages, mathematics and liberal studies) and choose between one to four elective subjects (the majority with two to three subjects) among the 20 available. However, on 31 March 2021, it has been announced that liberal studies will be renamed "citizenship and social development", and the curriculum will be changed, starting from 2021-2022 academic year and 2024 DSE.

Background and administration
Under the NSS, a number of subjects in the HKCEE and the HKALE have been combined to suit the varying interests and talents of students. School pupils study both core (compulsory) subjects and elective subjects. Most candidates in the HKDSE sit all four core subjects plus two or three electives to satisfy local university admission requirements.

In many HKDSE subjects, each student studies the Compulsory Part and a module of the student's choice, the Elective Part, which concentrates on a specific topic or skill. While in certain subjects such as Mathematics, students are only required to study the Compulsory Part, while the Elective Modules are voluntary. As such, an Elective Part forms a part of the subject curriculum, whereas an Extended module is designed for students with specific aims or those who have higher abilities who may want additional knowledge and skills. The selection of offerings for both Elective Parts and Modules varies from school to school, for example, some schools offer both M1 (Extended Module 1) and M2 for Mathematics, while others may offer only the Compulsory Part.
 Elective Part Example: English. The Elective Part of the English Language curriculum takes up 25% of total lesson time. The selection of Elective Parts is divided into two areas: "Language Arts" and "Non-Language Arts", each of which teaches English as used in different contexts and through various mediums. During HKDSE, candidates also have the choice to write either the higher level (B2) or the standard level (B1) part of the paper, in addition to the mandatory Part A. Writing B1 allows the candidate to attain as high as level 4 in that paper, while writing B2 allows a 5**(five-double-star).
 Extended Part Example: Mathematics. Students who wish to study Mathematics to a higher level have the flexibility to choose one of the two Extended Modules: "M1" Calculus and Statistics or "M2" Algebra and Calculus. However, the Extended Modules are considered only half a subject by the HKEAA, despite having syllabi amounting to full subjects. As a result, they became not as attractive to students, and there has been a decline in number of pupils studying them.

Written examinations of Category A (Traditional) subjects are usually conducted between early March through early May. Speaking (Oral) components and examinations for certain Category B (Applied Learning) subjects are administered earlier. Category C (Other Languages) subjects usually take place in June (French and Spanish may be taken in the previous November), in line with CAIE AS-level practice.

Before the exam, candidates have a chance to become familiar with the different level descriptors and samples and may use them as objectives for their study. Also, they can also familiarise with the exam requirement by doing DSE Past Paper, which can be found here. When results are released, candidates can have a clearer picture of their attainment level. For each level, there will be a DSE cut off score. Thus, tertiary institutions and employers also have more accurate and robust information for admission or recruitment purposes.

Subjects
HKDSE subjects are offered in three different categories, including 24 in Category A: NSS (Traditional), over 40 in Category B: ApL (Applied Learning) and six in Category C: Other Languages.

Category A: New Senior Secondary Subjects
Category A subjects are traditional school subjects. Exams in this category are held directly by HKEAA. Both Core Subjects (Compulsory for University Admission) and Elective Subjects fall under Category A. Results of these subjects are generally accepted for local and international university admission.

For Mathematics, levels of the Extended Modules (M1 and M2) are listed separately on the certificates.

Core subjects
 Chinese Language
 English Language
 Mathematics
 Before 2024: Liberal Studies (levels are divided into 7 parts, from 1 to 5**)
 Starting from 2024: Citizenship and Social Development (divided only into 2 levels, pass or fail)

For Mathematics, in addition to the Compulsory Part, candidates may take one of the following Extended Modules:
 Module 1 ("M1", Calculus and Statistics).
 Module 2 ("M2", Algebra and Calculus).

For Liberal Studies, the subject curriculum features six Modules, including:
 "Personal Development and Interpersonal Relationships."
 "Hong Kong Today."
 "Modern China."
 "Globalization."
 "Public Health."
 "Energy Technology and the Environment."

However, save in very particular cases and as determined by institutions, a pass in an Extended Part of a subject cannot substitute a pass in the Compulsory Part for university admission, especially when applying through JUPAS for UGC-funded courses.

Electives

Students can choose one to four electives among 20 Elective Subjects according to their interests and strengths. However, most schools do not offer a full selection of the 20 subjects in their curriculum due to practical limitations.

According to the Registration Statistics for 2018 released by the HKEAA, the most chosen subject is Physics, with a total of 11,658 candidates. Around 70.4% of students choose a combination two elective subjects, while 17.4% choose three elective subjects.

Category B: Applied Learning Subjects
Category B (ApL) subjects are offered by course providers, which are usually Higher Education Institutions. Assessments of these subjects are conducted by the course providers, and the results reported to the HKEAA for adjustment. They are mostly vocational or professional subjects.

Applied Learning Subjects may or may not be considered by tertiary institutions for admission, according to HKEAA, a reported level of "Attained" on the certificate is considered as equivalent to a Grade 2 in a Category A subject, and "Attained with Distinction" to Grade 3 or above. From 2018, "Attained with Distinction" has been further refined to "Attained with Distinction (I)" (equivalent to Grade 3) and "Attained with Distinction (II)" (equivalent to Grade 4 or above). However, the more prestigious universities in Hong Kong usually consider Category B subjects as mere 'Interest Groups' for admission purposes, believing them to be inferior to the traditional academic subjects in Category A.

Areas of study in Category B include:

Category C: Other Language Subjects
These are language electives. They may be used to replace Chinese Language for university admissions for students whose first language is not Chinese, but it may not be used to replace English. It may also be chosen as an elective for native Chinese speaking students, in which case it will not serve as an alternative language for UG admission. In many cases, in lieu of a Category C subject, an IGCSE Chinese Language pass (or similar Chinese qualification) can also be accepted for admission to UG programmes for non-Chinese speaking students.

Up to 2024, Category C subjects use the papers of CAIE GCE AS-level language subjects. These are provided and marked by Cambridge Assessment International Education. Starting from 2025, Official language examinations taken within 2 years before the HKDSE examination could be reported in the certificate. N3 or above is required for Japanese. Grade 3 or above is required for Korean. A2 or above is required for the remaining language subjects.

Tertiary Institutions are not obliged to recognise results of Category B or C subjects, while Category C subjects are generally accepted due to them being also an AS-Level subject, Category B subjects, especially for the more prestigious institutions, are usually only considered for reference in cases where two potential students are equal in other aspects.

School-based assessment

School-based Assessments (SBA) are conducted for the majority of subjects for school candidates, which notably includes three of the four core subjects, Chinese Language, English Language and Liberal Studies, with the exception of Mathematics, it reduces reliance on a one-off public examination as students' projects and assignments throughout senior secondary years are graded by their teachers and counted toward the HKDSE results on fixed weightings, after the grades being adjusted by HKEAA.

Grading
For Category A subjects, the performance of candidates is categorised and released on a scale of seven levels indicated on the examination certificate. Level 5** being the highest and level 1 the lowest. Distinction levels 5** and 5* (read as "five-double-stars" and "five-star") are awarded to the two best-performing groups of candidates attaining level 5. Unclassified Level (UNCL) are given in cases of absence, cheating, or an attempt not reaching the standards of level 1.

Category A: New Senior Secondary Subjects

UCAS tariff points for HKDSE Examination: 
Level 5** (top 10% of level 5 achievers)=56
Level 5* (top 30% of level 5 achievers)=52
Level 5=48
Level 4=32
Level 3=16
Level 2=N/A
Level 1=N/A

The UCAS Tariff points attached to each subject level (excluding Mathematics) is as shown above, UCAS is the university admission system in United Kingdom.

Category B: Applied Learning Subjects

Note: Albeit Category B subjects are taught to standards designed to be comparable to Category A subjects, with reference to the form above, to date the majority of local universities however, do not consider Category B subjects for admission by JUPAS.

Category C: Other Language Subjects

These subjects are graded by CAIE, on grades "A" to "E" (with grade "E" being the lowest and grade "A" the highest). An achievement below grade “E” is called 'Ungraded', and is not recorded on the diploma awarded to candidate.

Marking
In the criterion-referenced grading system, experts in relevant subject matters establish the marking standards for each level. Thereafter, level descriptors and examples are set and constantly reviewed based on syllabus objectives and statistical data, including exam statistics and candidate answer scripts. Gradings produced by a criterion-referenced system reflect a candidate's level of attainment in a particular subject instead of the rank order of the candidate in comparison to others.

Markers of HKDSE are mostly current teachers of secondary schools. They are appointed to different assessment centres to perform Onscreen Marking (OSM). Exam papers are first scanned into the database at scanning centres, and then distributed to the markers through computer.

Top Scorers' Schools 
Up to 2022, there are only 38 schools that have ever produced top scorers in HKDSE.

7 x 5** "Top Scorers" are candidates who obtained perfect scores of 5** in each of the four core subjects and three electives.

8 x 5** "Super Top Scorers" are candidates who obtained seven Level 5** in four core subjects and three electives, and an additional Level 5** in the Mathematics Extended (M1/M2) module.

Admission to local universities

The HKDSE is designed for local secondary school students in Hong Kong to measure their achievement and to enable them to gain admission to local universities through the unified Joint University Programmes Admissions System (JUPAS).

International qualifications, like IB Diploma, IGCSE, GCE A-levels and IALs, OSSD, and SAT/AP, on the other hand, are more often taken by private, DSS (Directly Subsidised, comparable to independent schools in other countries) or international school students. These international qualifications are becoming more popular in Hong Kong, due to the perceived difference in difficulty and grading between HKDSE and the international qualifications, leading to the perception in some parents and students that it is comparatively easier for a student to gain entrance to local universities with an international school leaving qualification. In addition, HKDSE holders applying through JUPAS must have results from at least 5 subjects, including the Compulsory Subject of Chinese Language, metaphorically referred to by students as 'the paper of death' due to its extensive coverage of Classical Chinese literatures written in a completely different writing system than Modern Standard Chinese; while international qualifications like IGCSE/A-level and IBD have more flexibility in the choice of subject and additional language for students.

Due to these differences and the perception of an advantage that international qualifications have over HKDSE in university admission, there has been a considerable amount of concern over the emergence of a bipartite education system, based on wealth instead of merit.

Impact on schools
One notable impact on schools in Hong Kong is the discontinued need for sixth form colleges due to the cancellation of HKALE and upper sixth. Nevertheless, some of these colleges, such as PLK Vicwood KT Chong Sixth Form College, remain in operation as senior secondary schools.

Criticism

Unbalanced focus
The HKDSE is criticized for placing too much emphasis on the four core subjects, causing some students to neglect the elective subjects. Tsui Lap-chee, then president of the University of Hong Kong at the introduction of HKDSE, commented: "The Education Bureau demands universities [to screen pupils by] setting the so-called 3322 as minimum entry requirement for undergraduate programmes — aka a minimal of grade 3 in Chinese and English Languages, and a minimal of grade 2 in Mathematics and Liberal Studies. [It is] insufficient for studying in universities." He proposed a minimal grade requirement for two elective subjects, which the Education Bureau rejected. He also mentioned that many students do not study the optional extended modules for Mathematics, leaving them lacking the advanced mathematics knowledge needed for science and engineering studies; it is very difficult for them to make this up in their undergraduate courses.

Hindrance to admission
Since the launch of the HKDSE, the Chinese language paper is often dubbed the "paper of death". Some have the opinion that the high expectation is well-founded since it is the main language used in daily life in Hong Kong, but every year nearly half of all candidates fail the subject. They hence lose the chance to gain entrance to a university because of the obligatiory "3322" requirement, even though tertiary education in Hong Kong is delivered in English. “3322” refers to level 3 for Chinese Language and English Language and level 2 for Mathematics Compulsory Part and Liberal Studies, compared to the past when language subjects were not compulsory at advanced level. It is also reported that some of the authors of passages employed in the Chinese papers themselves found the questions in the paper difficult or impossible to answer. Elaine Yau of SCMP commented that the exam results are "proving [HKDSE as] a major hindrance to admission".

Moreover, it is reported that the HKDSE is causing chronic stress in students.

2020 arrangements due to the COVID-19 outbreak 
The spread of COVID-19 in Hong Kong caused the Education Bureau (EDB) and HKEAA to remodel the 2020 HKDSE. At a press conference held on 6 February announcing the alternative plans, the Secretary for Education Kevin Yeung said that all oral and practical examinations to be held before 27 March would be postponed. He went on further to mention two different options then considered by the Bureau and the HKEAA. One of them was that written exams would take place on 27 March as scheduled, whereas physical education, music practicals and Chinese speakings be postponed to May. Option two was that all examinations would be postponed by four weeks, as well as cancelling all oral examinations. At the end of February, the bureau announced that option one would be adopted where HKDSE would be held as scheduled on 27 March and Chinese oral exams would be postponed to 18 May. The result releasing date would also be postponed to 15 July. Some measures were made by the Bureau to prevent the chance of virus transmission, such as providing candidates with face masks and checking their body temperature. For those who could not attend HKDSE due to health conditions, their final grade of the subject can be determined based on school performance, but the maximum grade they can obtain would be level 5. In mid-March, after a spike in COVID-19 cases reported in Hong Kong, the secretary announced that the HKDSE would be postponed by a month to 27 April, as in the previously discussed option 2.

Candidates expressed dissatisfaction over the new arrangements, demanding a cancellation of 2020 HKDSE. Some thought that with such a large number of candidates staying in a packed area for examination, the possibility of virus transmission would be high. Some also thought that the EDB should have made the call to postpone the exam earlier instead of just less than 2 weeks before the official exam date, which caused confusion and inconvenience to everyone concerned. In an interview with Hong Kong Free Press, a candidate hoped that the bureau would be more transparent in their decision-making process in the future, as the uncertainty surrounding the new arrangement had caused more burden to candidates and made them more stressed about the public exam.

2020 HKDSE History exam controversy 
In May, over 5,000 students took the HKDSE History exam. The exam is divided into two papers, with the first paper consisting of four compulsory Data-Based Question and the second paper requiring the candidate to choose to attempt two out of the seven essay questions. Among the four questions in Paper 1, Question 2 is set on the topic of Sino-Japanese relations during the first half of the 20th century. In part (c) of the question, which is also the third and the last sub-question, requires candidates to answer "Whether Japan did more good than harm to China between 1900 and 1945." based on the source provided and their own historical knowledge. A day after the exam, the EDB, the Hong Kong government officials, and major pro-establishment figures and legislators slammed the question for being "biased", "insensitive to the war crime victims who suffered from atrocities committed by the Japanese Army during Sino-Japanese War", and "hurting the pride and dignity of the 1.4 billion Chinese people". Hence, the government orders the invalidation of the question.

With the government intervention in the exam system, many candidates expressed their anger towards the government that the removal of the controversial question would unfairly affect their performance, and may also affect their admission into the local universities. A week later, the question was confirmed to be invalidated. Subsequently, a student group filed a judicial review to challenge the HKEAA decision to invalidate the question.

Many pro-democracy figures believed the government intervention on the examination system is reflecting the Central government growing influence in Hong Kong's local affairs. Many teachers from the Pro-Democracy HKPTU expressed their concern about the eroding academic freedom. On the other hand, pro-establishment figures believed that the local education system is "toxic" and "brainwashing" to promote local young people to become more rebellious against the Central and SAR government. In view of this problem, the pro-establishment figures called for the education system to be reformed and remove any elements of colonialism in the education system that have existed over the past 23 years.

See also

 Hong Kong Certificate of Education Examination
 Hong Kong Advanced Level Examination
 Malaysian Higher School Certificate (Sijil Tinggi Persekolahan Malaysia)
 Matriculation examination

References

External links
 Hong Kong Education Bureau 
 Hong Kong Examinations and Assessment Authority

Diploma in Secondary Education
School examinations in Hong Kong
Secondary school qualifications